Green Mountain is a  summit in the Blue Hills on the Kitsap Peninsula of Washington state, in the United States' Pacific Northwest.  It is the third highest point on the Kitsap Peninsula and in Kitsap County, Washington, after a nearby   unnamed peak and  Gold Mountain.

There is a forest road, open to motorized traffic, to the summit, where there is a picnic area with vistas of Seattle and the Cascade Mountains to the east, and the Olympic Mountains to the west.

, there is a single microwave tower on the mountain.

References

External links

Green Mountain State Forest Washington Department of Natural Resources
Will White: Green Mountain hiking
Hiking With my Brother: Green Mountain
Green Mountain State Forest: Gold Creek, Beaver Pond, and Wildcat Trail Loop at trails.com

Mountains of Washington (state)
Mountains of Kitsap County, Washington